KTNO may refer to:

 KTNO (AM), a radio station (620 AM) licensed to Plano, Texas, United States
 KEXB (AM), a radio station (1440 AM) licensed to University Park, Texas, United States, which held the call sign KTNO from 1997 to 2019
 KZMP (AM), a radio station (1540 AM) licensed to University Park, Texas, which held the call sign KTNO from 1993 to 1997